Rochegude is the name or part of the name of several communes in France:

 Rochegude, Drôme, in the Drôme department
 Rochegude, Gard, in the Gard department
 Rochegude, part of the commune of Charbonnières-les-Vieilles, in the Puy-de-Dôme department

oc:Ròcafòrt de Gardon